The enzyme 4-hydroxy-4-methyl-2-oxoglutarate aldolase catalyzes the chemical reaction

4-hydroxy-4-methyl-2-oxoglutarate  2 pyruvate

This enzyme belongs to the family of lyases, specifically the oxo-acid-lyases, which cleave carbon-carbon bonds.  The systematic name of this enzyme class is 4-hydroxy-4-methyl-2-oxoglutarate pyruvate-lyase (pyruvate-forming). Other names in common use include pyruvate aldolase, gamma-methyl-gamma-hydroxy-alpha-ketoglutaric aldolase, 4-hydroxy-4-methyl-2-ketoglutarate aldolase, and 4-hydroxy-4-methyl-2-oxoglutarate pyruvate-lyase.  This enzyme participates in benzoate degradation via hydroxylation and c5-branched dibasic acid metabolism.

References

 
 
 
 Boyer, P.D. (Ed.), The Enzymes, 3rd ed., vol. 7, Academic Press, New York, 1972, p. 281-302.

EC 4.1.3
Enzymes of unknown structure